Gorno Aleksandrovo is a small village in the Sliven Municipality in Bulgaria. The village is named after the governor of Eastern Rumelia, Aleksandar Bogoridi.

Villages in Sliven Province